(stylized in all caps) is a Japanese actor, model, and musician from Tottori Prefecture.

Career
In 2007, Nagase started his career as a Kansai Johnny's Jr. under Johnny & Associates, with which he was associated until 2010. He was a member of the Johnny's Jr. unit "Ossan" from 2007 to 2008. In 2011, he debuted as an actor under Ken-On, with which he was associated until August 2018. He worked as freelance from September 1, 2018. He is under Hitome from April 2021.

Filmography

TV series

Film

References

External links
Tusk at Hitome
The Empty Orchestra at Hitome
 
 

1993 births
Living people
21st-century Japanese male actors